Joharapuram is a village located in Aspari mandal in Kurnool district of Andhra Pradesh, India.

Temples 
 Sri Sri Sri Karremma Avva Temple
 Sri Sri Sri Adi Alluri Erukula Swamy Matham
 Allipeera Swami Mandhir
 lord shiva 
 anjineya swamy temple
 sanjeeva rayudu temple
 veera bramhendra swamy temple
 maremma avva temple 
 maddamma avva temple 
 lord krishna temple
 masjid

References

http://www.censusindia.gov.in/PopulationFinder/Sub_Districts_Master.aspx?state_code=28&district_code=21

Villages in Kurnool district